Vasyl Runich (born 21 January 2000) is a professional Ukrainian football midfielder who plays for Rukh Lviv.

Career
Runich was born in Zhydachiv Raion, Western Ukraine and is a product of Youth Sportive School in his native raion centre and the FC Karpaty Lviv School System, where played for it in the Ukrainian Premier League Reserves and Under 19 Championship during some seasons.

He made his debut for FC Karpaty as the second half-time substituted player in the draw home derby match against FC Lviv on 27 June 2020 in the Ukrainian Premier League.

References

External links
Profile at UAF website (Ukr)

2000 births
Living people
Ukrainian footballers
Association football midfielders
Ukrainian Premier League players
Ukrainian Second League players
FC Karpaty Lviv players
FC Rukh Lviv players
Sportspeople from Lviv Oblast